Plambeck is a surname. Notable people with the surname include:
, German entrepreneur and sports promoter, namesake of a football stadium in Norderstedt
Erica Plambeck, American operations researcher
Herb Plambeck (1908–2001), American agricultural journalist and administrator
Joachim Plambeck, German immigrant to Iowa, owner of Joachim Plambeck House
Juliane Plambeck (1952–1980), German Red Army Faction terrorist
Norbert and Otto Plambeck, founders of German wind energy company PNE AG and namesakes of Plambeck Bulgarian Wind Farm